The 1872 Oldham by-election was fought on 5 June 1872.  The byelection was fought due to the death of the incumbent MP of the Liberal Party, John Platt.  It was won by the Conservative candidate John Morgan Cobbett.

References

Oldham by-election
Oldham by-election
1870s in Lancashire
Elections in the Metropolitan Borough of Oldham
Oldham 1872
Oldham 1872